East Williamston is a village and community in Pembrokeshire, Wales. The community includes the villages of Pentlepoir, Cold Inn and Broadmoor, Wooden and Moreton. The community had a population of 1,787 in 2001, increasing to 1,844 at the 2011 Census.

Governance
With the community of Jeffreyston, it makes up the Pembrokeshire electoral ward of  East Williamston, which had a population of 2,327 in 2001, with 11 per cent Welsh speakers. The ward population had increased to 2,418 at the 2011 Census.

Worship
It was originally a chapelry of the parish of Begelly.

Demography
Its census populations were: 341 (1801), 551 (1851), 397 (1901), 387 (1951), 473 (1981).

The percentage of Welsh speakers was 5% cent (1891), 12% (1931), 3% (1971), 11% (2011).

Education
The nearest schools are S t Oswalds VC School , Sageston CP School,  Ysgol Greenhill School, Ysgol Glan y Môr, Ysgol y Preseli and Ysgol Gyfun Gymraeg Bro Myrddin.

References

External links 
Historical information and further sources on GENUKI
Photos of East Williamston and surrounding area on Geograph
East Williamston Community Association

Villages in Pembrokeshire
Communities in Pembrokeshire